From May 4–10, 1933, a tornado outbreak sequence produced at least 33 tornadoes. Among them was the Beaty Swamp tornado, a violent F4 that struck shortly after midnight CST on May 11, 1933, in Overton County, Tennessee, killing 35 people, injuring 150 others, and devastating the unincorporated communities of Beaty Swamp and Bethsaida. The storm was the second-deadliest tornado in the history of Middle Tennessee, even though it struck a sparsely populated, rural area. The community of Beaty Swamp ceased to exist and does not appear on any current maps. The only landmark that alludes to the former community is Beaty Swamp Road, which intersects Highway 111 in the northeast corner of Overton County. The severe weather event that generated the tornado also produced others, including long-tracked, intense tornadoes or tornado families that devastated portions of Alabama, South Carolina, and Kentucky, killing a combined total of 76 people.

Confirmed tornadoes

May 4 event

May 5 event

May 6 event

May 7 event

May 8 event

May 9 event

May 10 event

Tompkinsville–Sewell–Cundiff–Russell Springs, Kentucky

A tornado family killed 16 people and destroyed 60 homes in Tompkinsville, striking the southern portion of the city and devastating African-American communities. Farther northeast, the tornado killed two more people, at Sewell. Across Monroe County 50 injuries were reported. The tornado may have weakened as it headed northeastward, causing two injuries in Cumberland County and two more deaths near Cundiff in Adair County. The tornado passed within  of downtown Russell Springs, leveling 100 or more homes on the southeastern edge of town. At least 14 and possibly as many as 20 fatalities occurred in or near Russell Springs. Outside Russell Springs, chickens were reportedly left featherless. At least 87 people were injured and losses totaled $245,000. As many as 100 injuries may have occurred in Russell County alone. The tornado was the third-deadliest Kentucky tornado on record, behind one in 1917, with 65 deaths, and another in 1890, with 76 deaths. The 1974 tornado in Brandenburg was the fourth deadliest, with 28 deaths.

Beaty Swamp–Bethsaida, Tennessee

The tornado subsequently struck the small settlement of Beaty Swamp, obliterating every home and causing 33 fatalities there, including an entire family of nine. Little debris was left in the vicinity, a reaper-binder was thrown , and cars were moved hundreds of feet. Almost everyone in Beaty Swamp was either injured or killed. After devastating Beaty Swamp, the tornado continued through Bethsaida and past West Fork before dissipating near Byrdstown. In Pickett County the tornado caused only minor damage to properties and trees. Heavy rainfall, suggestive of a high-precipitation supercell, immediately preceded the tornado. Another violent tornado did not hit the area until April 3, 1974.

See also
List of North American tornadoes and tornado outbreaks

Notes

References

Sources

 

 

F4 tornadoes by date
Tornadoes of 1933
Tornadoes in Tennessee
Destroyed towns
1933 in Tennessee
Overton County, Tennessee
1933 natural disasters in the United States
Tornado outbreak sequence